Niall Mac Eachmharcaigh, Irish actor, plays the part of John Joe Daly on the Irish language TG4 drama, Ros na Rún.

Mac Eachmharcaigh has been a series regular since 2002, and began his career as a prompter in 1973.

His acting credits include the Irish language programme Anois agus Aris (1980) and appearances in C.U. Burn.

External links
 https://web.archive.org/web/20090830012902/http://r0snarun.com/index.php?option=com_content&task=view&id=40&Itemid=61

Year of birth missing (living people)
Living people
Irish male television actors
People from County Donegal
TG4 people